Melvin Paul Guillard, Jr. (born March 30, 1983) is an American mixed martial artist who competes in the Middleweight division. Guillard most notably competed in the Lightweight division of the Ultimate Fighting Championship (UFC), Bellator MMA and World Series of Fighting. He debuted in the company on The Ultimate Fighter 2 television series, losing to Josh Burkman by decision in the first Welterweight elimination bout. Guillard currently holds the UFC record for most TKO/KO victories (eight) in the Lightweight division, surpassing the previous record held by Multi-Divisional Champion B.J. Penn with his knockout of Shane Roller at UFC 132. He again extended this record in his knockout victory over Mac Danzig at UFC on Fox: Johnson vs. Moraga.

Background
Born and raised in Louisiana, Guillard competed in various sports such as basketball before he began wrestling at Bonnabel High School. Guillard was talented, becoming a State Champion (152 lbs) in his senior year, winning the Class 5A MVP award, and also was a member of the Louisiana Junior National Team for two years. Guillard continued competing for one year at Colby Community College in Kansas and graduated with a degree in criminal law. Guillard had originally become drawn to mixed martial arts due to his wrestling coach's connections with the sport, and had the goal of fighting professionally by his early teens. By the time he was 16 years old, Guillard was preparing to fight professionally.

Mixed martial arts career

Early career
In 2005, Guillard defeated fellow future UFC veteran Roger Huerta by decision, but the fight was ruled a No Contest after Huerta appealed the decision to the commission, accusing Guillard of greasing between rounds one and two.

The Ultimate Fighter 2
Guillard participated in The Ultimate Fighter 2, but was eliminated from the competition after losing a unanimous decision to Josh Burkman. He returned on the season finale, defeating Marcus Davis by technical knockout due to a cut. Fighting again at Welterweight, Guillard lost his next fight to Josh Neer, submitting to a first round triangle choke. Guillard had earlier opened a large cut on Neer's forehead.

Ultimate Fighting Championship
After the lightweight division was reinstated at UFC 58, Guillard began to transition to this weight class. He made his UFC lightweight debut at UFC 60, defeating Rick Davis by first-round KO. At UFC 63 on September 23, 2006, Guillard fought former WEC lightweight champion Gabe Ruediger and won the fight via KO by a body blow. Guillard next fought Joe Stevenson in the main event of UFC Fight Night 9 and submitted to a guillotine choke 27 seconds into the fight, after being stunned by a punch. Guillard also submitted in his next fight, against Rich Clementi at UFC 79, to a rear naked choke at 4:40 of the first round. Before and after the bout, the fighters talked trash. Guillard gave Clementi the finger during the introductions and attempted to attack him after the fight, but was restrained by referee Herb Dean. He was subsequently released from the UFC, but was brought back after a win in a minor promotion.

Guillard returned to the UFC at UFC 86, knocking out Dennis Siver in 36 seconds and earning a Knockout of the Night bonus. He was slated to fight Spencer Fisher at UFC 90, but tore his ACL while training and was replaced by Shannon Gugerty.

Guillard next won a split decision over Gleison Tibau at The Ultimate Fighter: United States vs. United Kingdom Finale on June 20, 2009.

Guillard submitted to a guillotine choke by Nate Diaz on September 16, at UFC Fight Night: Diaz vs. Guillard.

On February 6, 2010, Guillard faced Ronys Torres at UFC 109. He joined coach Greg Jackson's camp in Albuquerque, New Mexico to prepare for the fight. He showed improved submission defense and patience in the fight, winning a close unanimous decision (29-28, 29-28, 29-28).

Guillard was scheduled to face Thiago Tavares at UFC 114, but Tavares was forced off the card with an elbow injury. Guillard instead fought and knocked out UFC newcomer Waylon Lowe in the first round.

On September 25, 2010, Guillard won a split decision over Jeremy Stephens at UFC 119.

Guillard was expected to face Yves Edwards on January 22, 2011, at UFC Fight Night 23. However, headliner Kenny Florian pulled out of his fight with Evan Dunham due to injury and Guillard replaced him. He defeated Dunham in the first round via TKO by knees. The finish earned him the Knockout of the Night award.

Guillard next defeated Shane Roller via first-round KO on July 2, 2011 at UFC 132.

Guillard faced Joe Lauzon on October 6, 2011 at UFC 136.  Guillard was quickly submitted with a rear naked choke after being stunned by a counter left hook from Lauzon.

Guillard next faced Jim Miller in the main event of UFC on FX 1 on January 20, 2012. After dropping Miller in the early going, Guillard was submitted in the first round.

Guillard next fought Fabrício Camões on July 7, 2012 at UFC 148. He won the fight via unanimous decision.

Guillard fought Donald Cerrone on August 11, 2012 at UFC 150, and was knocked out early in the first round after clipping Cerrone with a big left hand. He received a $60,000 Fight of the Night bonus award for his effort. This was the first knockout loss of his career.

Guillard was scheduled to face Jamie Varner on December 15, 2012 at The Ultimate Fighter 16 Finale.  However, Varner fell ill the day of the event and the bout was scrapped from the card.  The bout with Varner was rescheduled for December 29, 2012 at UFC 155. Guillard was taken down by Varner several times in their bout, losing a split decision.

Guillard faced Mac Danzig on July 27, 2013 at UFC on Fox 8. He knocked Danzig out in the second round. The win earned Guillard his third Knockout of the Night bonus award.

Guillard faced Ross Pearson on October 26, 2013 at UFC Fight Night 30. The fight ended in a no contest when Pearson was deemed unable to continue after being cut on the forehead by an accidental illegal knee. As a result of the controversial result, a rematch was booked for UFC Fight Night 37 at March 8, 2014 in London. However, Pearson pulled out of the fight due to injury and was replaced by Michael Johnson.  Guillard lost the lackluster fight via unanimous decision and was subsequently released from the promotion.

World Series of Fighting
On April 7, 2014, World Series of Fighting executive vice president Ali Abdel-Aziz confirmed Guillard had signed a multi-fight contract.

Guillard made his debut at WSOF 11 on July 5, 2014 against Gesias Cavalcante. He won the fight via TKO in the second round.

Guillard was expected to challenge Justin Gaethje for his WSOF Lightweight championship on November 15, 2014 at WSOF 15. However, Guillard missed weight for the bout and it was changed to a catchweight affair.  Guillard lost the fight via split decision.

On April 30, 2015 Melvin was released by the World Series of Fighting. His manager, Malki Kawa, announced the news on Twitter: "I just received what I asked for from WSOF which is the release for [Melvin]... Should have a new home for him shortly".

Bellator MMA
On May 4, 2015, Bellator MMA president Scott Coker announced Melvin's signing in a press release, stating "We are excited to have Melvin coming onboard."

In his debut fight for the promotion, Guillard was given the chance to face a hand picked opponent and chose Brandon Girtz, who he fought at Bellator 141 on August 28, 2015. His decision to face Girtz ended up backfiring on him as he lost the fight via split decision.

In his second fight for the promotion, Guillard faced Derek Campos on February 19, 2016 at Bellator 149. He lost the fight via knockout in the second round.

In his third fight for the promotion, Guillard faced David Rickels on July 21, 2016 at Bellator 159. Guillard earned his first win in Bellator via a series of elbows and punches to defeat Rickels via KO in the first round. The win was overturned after Guillard tested positive for a non-performance-enhancing banned substance. Guillard was subsequently suspended for one year by the Kansas Athletic Commission. After agreeing to enter rehab and completing the program, Guillard's suspension was subsequently reduced to six months.

Guillard faced Chidi Njokuani in the main event at Bellator 171 on January 27, 2017. He lost the fight by unanimous decision.

Rizin FF
In July 2018, Guillard faced Takanori Gomi at Rizin 11. He missed weight for the fight and lost by knockout at 2:33 in the first round. Guillard alleges that Rizin officials altered the rules of his match before the fight, telling him that for his match he would not be allowed to use either soccer kicks or knees to the head of a grounded opponent, forcing to him to change his planned strategy and his attire, putting on wrestling shoes. Guillard suspects that individuals were trying to possibly 'protect' Gomi.

Regional promotions
After the lone bout in Rizin, Guillard faced Terry House Jr. at United Combat League 32 on October 18, 2019. He lost the fight via unanimous decision.

Guillard was next expected to face Erick Lozano at Lights Out 7 on February 8, 2020. However, the bout never materialized due to unknown reasons.

Bare Knuckle Boxing

BKB
On April 22, 2017, Guillard took part in a bare knuckle boxing event for Bare Knuckle Boxing in England. He faced Dan Breeze at BKB 5 and won the fight via KO after Dan Breeze failed to respond in time to the 10 count. He expressed before the fight he wanted to fight BKB's undefeated, and biggest star, Middleweight Champion Jimmy "Celtic Warrior" Sweeney, and after the fight on 2 separate occasions nearly got into a fight with Sweeney and his entourage, even grabbing a butter knife at one point, with fellow former UFC fighters Shonie Carter, who recorded the altercation, and Wes Sims present at the scene.

At BKB 6 on July 1, 2017 Guillard faced the "Undisputed King of Bare Knuckle" and its #1 star, Jimmy "Celtic Warrior" Sweeney. The fight was held at 12 stone (168 lbs). Guillard lost the bout by unanimous decision.

Guillard had a rematch with Sweeney on September 9, 2017 at BKB 7. He again lost the bout by unanimous decision.

Guillard fought again on November 4, 2017 against Leighton Brady, who stepped in on four days notice after Guillard's original opponent dropped out. Although dropped almost immediately at the beginning of the fight, Guillard came back and dropped his opponent several times, finally dropping Brady a final time in the third round, winning by TKO after Brady failed to get up in time for the 10 count. Guillard expressed in the post-fight interview he wanted a title shot in BKB at Lightweight.

BKFC
After the four-fight stint in BKB, Guillard made his promotional debut in BKFC against Isaac Vallie-Flagg at Bare Knuckle FC 7 on August 10, 2019. He lost the fight via technical knockout due to a hand injury that rendered him unable to continue after the third round.

In his sophomore bout he faced Scott O'Shaughnessy at Bare Knuckle FC 16 on March 16, 2021. He lost the fight via first-minute knockout.

He then faced Harris Stephenson at Bare Knuckle FC 20 on August 20, 2021. He lost the fight via disqualification in the second round due to an illegal blow that was ruled an intentional foul.

Guillard faced Joe Riggs at BKFC Fight Night: Montana on October 9, 2021. He lost the fight via first-minute knockout, incurring significant facial fractures.

On January 27, 2020, The Association of Boxing Commissions issued a news release concerning Guillard's expected fight at the BKFC: Knucklemania 2 event to take place on Feb 19 2020. In the release they stated that Florida Athletic Commission Executive Director Patrick Cunningham had announced that the FAC had denied BKFC’s bout proposal for a matchup between Guillard and Ulysses Diaz due to “serious health concern" with respect to Melvin Guillard.

Personal life
Guillard is married. He is a playable character in the UFC Undisputed 3 video game.

Substance abuse and family
Guillard fought The Ultimate Fighter 2 winner Joe Stevenson in the main event of UFC Fight Night: Stevenson vs Guillard on April 5, 2007, and submitted to a guillotine choke in 27 seconds after being dropped by a jab. He publicly accused Stevenson of using Human Growth Hormone (HGH). Guillard's own pre-fight urine sample later tested positive for cocaine. The Nevada State Athletic Commission subsequently suspended Guillard for eight months and fined him $2,100. Melvin attributed his drug abuse to the death of his father at age 44, from cirrhosis after a life of heavy drinking.

He later said, "I made a lot of excuses for myself because of my father's death, and I regret it now because my father left me and he always told me, 'Son, never live a regret. Never make excuses for yourself. Be a man and take responsibility for whatever you do in life.'" He has said his dad was his best friend and biggest fan, and never missed watching him fight. However, after Hurricane Katrina, his dad (a contractor) was backed up with work and so didn't make it to Guillard's UFC debut. He died before he could ever watch him fight in the UFC.

Legal troubles
In September 2018, news surfaced that Guillard was facing four felony charges stemming from two separate incidents: domestic violence against his girlfriend and an assault at a Denver bar. Subsequently it was revealed that there were two separate incidents in Denver bars, in June and September 2018. For the bar incidents, Guillard was eventually charged with six charges, including multiple felony assaults. He made a deal with the prosecutor for misdemeanor assault and was jailed. He was released in July 2019 with two years of probation.

In August 2019, news surfaced that Guillard was to appear at a court hearing on August 28, 2019, regarding the domestic violence incident, facing a second degree assault and a third degree assault charges.

Championships and accomplishments
 Ultimate Fighting Championship
 Knockout of the Night (Three times) vs. Dennis Siver, Evan Dunham & Mac Danzig.
 Fight of the Night (Two times) vs. Josh Neer & Donald Cerrone.
 Tied (Edson Barboza) for third most knockout victories in UFC Lightweight division history (7)
 Most knockdowns landed in UFC Lightweight division history (13).

Mixed martial arts record

|-
|Loss
|align=center| 32–22–2 (3)
|Terry House, Jr.
|Decision (unanimous)
|United Combat League 32
|
|align=center|3
|align=center|5:00
|Hammond, Indiana, United States
|
|-
|Loss
|align=center| 32–21–2 (3)
|Takanori Gomi
|KO (punches)
|Rizin 11
|
|align=center|1
|align=center|2:33
|Saitama, Japan
|
|-
|Loss
|align=center| 32–20–2 (3)
|Maurice Jackson
|TKO (punches)
|SCL 65: Destination
|
|align=center|2
|align=center|1:50
|Denver, Colorado, United States
|
|-
|Loss
|align=center| 32–19–2 (3)
|Israel Adesanya
|TKO (punches)
|Australian Fighting Championship 20
|
|align=center|1
|align=center|4:48
|Melbourne, Australia
|
|-
|Loss
|align=center| 32–18–2 (3)
|Muslim Salikhov
|KO (spinning hook kick)
|Kunlun Fight MMA 12
|
|align=center|1
|align=center|1:33
|Yantai, China
|
|-
|-
|Loss
|align=center| 32–17–2 (3)
|Chidi Njokuani
|Decision (unanimous)
|Bellator 171
|
|align=center|3
|align=center|5:00
|Mulvane, Kansas, United States
|
|-
|NC
|align=center| 32–16–2 (3)
|David Rickels
|NC (overturned)
| Bellator 159
|
|align=center|1
|align=center|2:14
|Mulvane, Kansas, United States
|
|-
|Loss
|align=center| 32–16–2 (2)
|Derek Campos
|KO (punches)
| Bellator 149
|
|align=center|2
|align=center|0:32
|Houston, Texas, United States
|
|-
|Loss
|align=center| 32–15–2 (2)
| Brandon Girtz
| Decision (split)
|Bellator 141
|
|align=center| 3
|align=center| 5:00
|Temecula, California, United States
|
|-
| Loss
| align=center| 32–14–2 (2)
| Justin Gaethje
| Decision (split)
| WSOF 15
| 
| align=center| 3
| align=center| 5:00
| Tampa, Florida, United States
| 
|-
| Win
| align=center| 32–13–2 (2)
| Gesias Cavalcante
| TKO (punches and elbows)
| WSOF 11
| 
| align=center| 2
| align=center| 2:36
| Daytona Beach, Florida, United States
| 
|-
| Loss
| align=center| 31–13–2 (2)
| Michael Johnson
| Decision (unanimous)
| UFC Fight Night: Gustafsson vs. Manuwa
| 
| align=center| 3
| align=center| 5:00
| London, England, United Kingdom
| 
|-
| NC
| align=center| 31–12–2 (2)
| Ross Pearson
| NC (illegal knee)
| UFC Fight Night: Machida vs. Munoz
| 
| align=center| 1
| align=center| 1:57
| Manchester, England, United Kingdom
|
|-
| Win
| align=center| 31–12–2 (1)
| Mac Danzig
| KO (punches)
| UFC on Fox: Johnson vs. Moraga
| 
| align=center| 2
| align=center| 2:47
| Seattle, Washington, United States
| 
|-
| Loss
| align=center| 30–12–2 (1)
| Jamie Varner
| Decision (split)
| UFC 155
| 
| align=center| 3
| align=center| 5:00
| Las Vegas, Nevada, United States
| 
|-
| Loss
| align=center| 30–11–2 (1)
| Donald Cerrone
| KO (head kick and punch) 
| UFC 150
| 
| align=center| 1
| align=center| 1:16
| Denver, Colorado, United States
| 
|-
| Win
| align=center| 30–10–2 (1)
| Fabrício Camões
| Decision (unanimous)
| UFC 148
| 
| align=center| 3
| align=center| 5:00
| Las Vegas, Nevada, United States
| 
|-
| Loss
| align=center|  (1)
| Jim Miller
| Submission (rear-naked choke)
| UFC on FX: Guillard vs. Miller
| 
| align=center| 1
| align=center| 3:04
| Nashville, Tennessee, United States
| 
|-
| Loss
| align=center| 29–9–2 (1)
| Joe Lauzon
| Submission (rear-naked choke)
| UFC 136
| 
| align=center| 1
| align=center| 0:47
| Houston, Texas, United States
| 
|-
| Win
| align=center| 29–8–2 (1)
| Shane Roller
| KO (punches)
| UFC 132
| 
| align=center| 1
| align=center| 2:12
| Las Vegas, Nevada, United States
| 
|-
| Win
| align=center| 28–8–2 (1)
| Evan Dunham
| TKO (knees)
| UFC: Fight For The Troops 2
| 
| align=center| 1
| align=center| 2:58
| Fort Hood, Texas, United States
| 
|-
| Win
| align=center| 27–8–2 (1)
| Jeremy Stephens
| Decision (split)
| UFC 119
| 
| align=center| 3
| align=center| 5:00
| Indianapolis, Indiana, United States
| 
|-
| Win
| align=center| 26–8–2 (1)
| Waylon Lowe
| TKO (knee to the body) 
| UFC 114
| 
| align=center| 1
| align=center| 3:28
| Las Vegas, Nevada, United States
| 
|-
| Win
| align=center| 25–8–2 (1)
| Ronys Torres
| Decision (unanimous)
| UFC 109
| 
| align=center| 3
| align=center| 5:00
| Las Vegas, Nevada, United States
| 
|-
| Loss
| align=center| 24–8–2 (1)
| Nate Diaz
| Submission (guillotine choke)
| UFC Fight Night: Diaz vs. Guillard
| 
| align=center| 2
| align=center| 2:13
| Oklahoma City, Oklahoma, United States
| 
|-
| Win
| align=center| 24–7–2 (1)
| Gleison Tibau
| Decision (split)
| The Ultimate Fighter: United States vs. United Kingdom Finale
| 
| align=center| 3
| align=center| 5:00
| Las Vegas, Nevada, United States
| 
|-
| Win
| align=center| 23–7–2 (1)
| Dennis Siver
| TKO (punches)
| UFC 86
| 
| align=center| 1
| align=center| 0:36
| Las Vegas, Nevada, United States
| 
|-
| Win
| align=center| 22–7–2 (1)
| Eric Regan
| Decision (unanimous)
| RITC 105: Friday Night Fights
| 
| align=center| 3
| align=center| 3:00
| Phoenix, Arizona, United States
| 
|-
| Loss
| align=center| 21–7–2 (1)
| Rich Clementi
| Submission (rear-naked choke)
| UFC 79
| 
| align=center| 1
| align=center| 4:40
| Las Vegas, Nevada, United States
| 
|-
| Loss
| align=center| 21–6–2 (1)
| Joe Stevenson
| Submission (guillotine choke)
| UFC Fight Night: Stevenson vs. Guillard
| 
| align=center| 1
| align=center| 0:27
| Las Vegas, Nevada, United States
| 
|-
| Win
| align=center| 21–5–2 (1)
| Gabe Ruediger
| TKO (body punch)
| UFC 63
| 
| align=center| 2
| align=center| 1:01
| Anaheim, California, United States
| 
|-
| Win
| align=center| 20–5–2 (1)
| Rick Davis
| KO (punch)
| UFC 60
| 
| align=center| 1
| align=center| 1:37
| Los Angeles, California, United States
| 
|-
| Loss
| align=center| 19–5–2 (1)
| Josh Neer
| Submission (triangle choke)
| UFC Fight Night 3
| 
| align=center| 1
| align=center| 4:20
| Las Vegas, Nevada, United States
| 
|-
| Win
| align=center| 19–4–2 (1)
| Marcus Davis
| TKO (doctor stoppage)
| The Ultimate Fighter 2 Finale
| 
| align=center| 2
| align=center| 2:55
| Las Vegas, Nevada, United States
| 
|-
| NC
| align=center| 18–4–2 (1)
| Roger Huerta
| NC (overturned) 
| Freestyle Fighting Championships 14
| 
| align=center| 3
| align=center| 5:00
| Biloxi, Mississippi, United States
| 
|-
| Win
| align=center| 18–4–2
| Peter Kaljevic
| TKO (elbows)
| Freestyle Fighting Championships 14
| 
| align=center| 1
| align=center| 2:24
| Biloxi, Mississippi, United States
| 
|-
| Win
| align=center| 17–4–2
| Darrell Smith
| TKO (punches)
| Freestyle Fighting Championships 14 
| 
| align=center| 1
| align=center| 3:07
| Biloxi, Mississippi, United States
| 
|-
| Win
| align=center| 16–4–2
| Rob Emerson
| Decision (split)
| RCF: Cold Hearted
| 
| align=center| 3
| align=center| 5:00
| Biloxi, Mississippi, United States
| 
|-
| Loss
| align=center| 15–4–2
| Santino Defranco
| Submission (triangle choke)
| ISCF: Domination at the DAC
| 
| align=center| 1
| align=center| 2:33
| Atlanta, Georgia, United States
| 
|-
| Win
| align=center| 15–3–2
| Jason Hathaway
| TKO (punches) 
| ISCF: Compound Fracture 
| 
| align=center| 1 
| align=center| 0:37 
| Atlanta, Georgia, United States
| 
|-
| Draw
| align=center| 14–3–2
| LaVerne Clark
| Draw
| RCF: Duel in the Delta
| 
| align=center| 3
| align=center| 5:00
| Tunica, Mississippi, United States
| 
|-
| Win
| align=center| 14–3–1
| Angel Nievens
| Decision (unanimous) 	
| FFC 11: Explosion
| 
| align=center| 3
| align=center| 5:00
| Biloxi, Mississippi, United States
| 
|-
| Loss
| align=center| 13–3–1
| Ryan Stout
| Submission (armbar)
| Battle of New Orleans 14
| 
| align=center| 1
| align=center| 2:55
| New Orleans, Louisiana, United States
| 
|-
| Draw
| align=center| 13–2–1
| Lee King
| Draw
| Battle of New Orleans 13
| 
| align=center| 3
| align=center| 5:00
| New Orleans, Louisiana, United States
| 
|-
| Win
| align=center| 13–2
| Rich Miller
| TKO (punches)
| Extreme Challenge 58
| 
| align=center| 2
| align=center| 2:07
| Medina, Minnesota, United States
| 
|-
| Win
| align=center| 12–2
| Kyle Bradley
| TKO (punches)
| Freestyle Fighting Championships 9
| 
| align=center| 1
| align=center| 4:20
| Biloxi, Mississippi, United States
| 
|-
| Loss
| align=center| 11–2
| Jake Short
| Decision (unanimous)
| Freestyle Fighting Championships 8
| 
| align=center| 3
| align=center| 5:00
| Biloxi, Mississippi, United States
| 
|-
| Loss
| align=center| 11–1
| Carlo Prater
| Submission (guillotine choke)
| Freestyle Fighting Championships 7
| 
| align=center| 1
| align=center| 2:32
| Biloxi, Mississippi, United States
| 
|-
| Win
| align=center| 11–0
| Justin Wieman
| TKO (punches) 
| ISCF: Anarchy in August
| 
| align=center| 2
| align=center| N/A
| Atlanta, Georgia, United States
| 
|-
| Win
| align=center| 10–0
| Kyle Bradley
| Submission (armbar)
| FFC 6: No Love
| 
| align=center| 1
| align=center| 2:54
| Biloxi, Mississippi, United States
| 
|-
| Win
| align=center| 9–0
| Paul Purcell
| TKO (punches) 
| Art of War 2
| 
| align=center| 1
| align=center| N/A
| Kalispell, Montana, United States
| 
|-
| Win
| align=center| 8–0
| Diego Saraiva
| KO (punches) 
| ISCF: May Madness
| 
| align=center| 1
| align=center| N/A
| Atlanta, Georgia, United States
| 
|-
| Win
| align=center| 7–0
| Alex Kronofsky
| KO (punch)
| Battle of New Orleans 6
| 
| align=center| 1
| align=center| 1:32
| New Orleans, Louisiana, United States
| 
|-
| Win
| align=center| 6–0
| Aaron Williams
| TKO (punches)
| Freestyle Fighting Championships 5
| 
| align=center| 1
| align=center| 1:43
| Biloxi, Mississippi, United States
| 
|-
| Win
| align=center| 5–0
| Victor Estrada
| Submission (armbar)
| Battle of New Orleans 5
| 
| align=center| 1
| align=center| 2:04
| New Orleans, Louisiana, United States
| 
|-
| Win
| align=center| 4–0
| Rod Ramirez
| TKO (punches) 
| Battle of New Orleans 4
| 
| align=center| 2
| align=center| 0:32
| New Orleans, Louisiana, United States
| 
|-
| Win
| align=center| 3–0
| Joe Jordan
| Decision (unanimous) 
| Battle of New Orleans 3
| 
| align=center| 2
| align=center| 5:00
| New Orleans, Louisiana, United States
| 
|-
| Win
| align=center| 2–0
| Jonathon Hargroder
| KO (punch) 
| Battle of New Orleans 2
| 
| align=center| 1
| align=center| 0:31
| New Orleans, Louisiana, United States
| 
|-
| Win
| align=center| 1–0
| Calvin Martin
| Decision (unanimous)
| Battle of New Orleans 1
| 
| align=center| 2
| align=center| 5:00
| New Orleans, Louisiana
|

Bare Knuckle Boxing Record

|-
|Loss
|align=center|2–6
|Joe Riggs
|KO (punch)
|BKFC Fight Night: Montana
|
|align=center|1
|align=center|0:59
|Billings, Montana, United States
|
|-
|Loss
|align=center|2–5
|Harris Stephenson
|DQ (intentional foul)
|Bare Knuckle FC 20
|
|align=center|2
|align=center|0:15
|Biloxi, Mississippi, United States
|
|-
|Loss
|align=center|2–4
|Scott O’Shaughnessy	
|TKO (punches)
|Bare Knuckle FC 16
|
|align=center|1
|align=center|0:46
|Biloxi, Mississippi, United States 
|
|-
|Loss
|align=center|2–3
|Isaac Vallie-Flagg
|TKO (hand injury)
|Bare Knuckle FC 7 
|
|align=center|3
|align=center|2:00
|Biloxi, Mississippi, United States 
|
|-
|Win
|align=center|2–2
|Leighton Brady
|KO (unable to answer count)
|BKB 8
|
|align=center|3
|align=center|0:40
|Coventry, England, United Kingdom
|
|-
|Loss
|align=center|1–2
|Jimmy Sweeney
|Decision (unanimous)
|BKB 7
|
|align=center|5
|align=center|2:00
|Liverpool, England, United Kingdom
|
|-
|Loss
|align=center|1–1
|Jimmy Sweeney
|Decision (unanimous)
|BKB 6
|
|align=center|5
|align=center|2:00
|London, England, United Kingdom
|
|-
|Win
|align=center|1–0
|Dan Breeze
|KO (Unable to Answer Count)
|BKB 5
|
|align=center|2
|align=center|N/A
|Coventry, England, United Kingdom
|
|-

See also
List of Bellator MMA alumni
List of mixed martial artists with professional boxing records

References

External links
 Official UFC Profile
Official Melvin Guillard website

Living people
1983 births
American male sport wrestlers
American male mixed martial artists
American sportspeople in doping cases
Doping cases in mixed martial arts
Mixed martial artists from Louisiana
African-American mixed martial artists
Lightweight mixed martial artists
Mixed martial artists utilizing boxing
Mixed martial artists utilizing judo
Mixed martial artists utilizing Brazilian jiu-jitsu
Bare-knuckle boxers
Ultimate Fighting Championship male fighters
American practitioners of Brazilian jiu-jitsu
American male judoka
African-American boxers
Boxers from Louisiana
American male boxers
21st-century African-American sportspeople
20th-century African-American people